Til Death Do Us Part is an EP by noise rock band The Honeymoon Killers, released in 1990 by King Size Records.

Track listing

Personnel 
Adapted from the Til Death Do Us Part liner notes.
The Honeymoon Killers
 Sally Edroso – drums, vocals, bass guitar (4)
 Jerry Teel – electric guitar, vocals, cover art, illustrations
 Lisa Wells – bass guitar, drums (4)

Release history

References

External links 
 

1990 EPs
The Honeymoon Killers (American band) albums
Albums produced by Wharton Tiers